In Unicode, the Sumero-Akkadian Cuneiform script is covered in three blocks in the Supplementary Multilingual Plane (SMP):
 U+12000–U+123FF Cuneiform
 U+12400–U+1247F Cuneiform Numbers and Punctuation
 U+12480–U+1254F Early Dynastic Cuneiform

The sample glyphs in the chart file published by the Unicode Consortium show the characters in their Classical Sumerian form (Early Dynastic period, mid 3rd millennium BCE). The characters as written during the 2nd and 1st millennia BCE, the era during which the vast majority of cuneiform texts were written, are considered font variants of the same characters.

Organization
The final proposal for Unicode encoding of the script was submitted by two cuneiform scholars working with an experienced Unicode proposal writer in June 2004.
The base character inventory is derived from the list of Ur III signs compiled by the Cuneiform Digital Library Initiative of UCLA based on the inventories of Miguel Civil, Rykle Borger (2003), and Robert Englund. Rather than opting for a direct ordering by glyph shape and complexity, according to the numbering of an existing catalogue, the Unicode order of glyphs was based on the Latin alphabetic order of their 'main' Sumerian transliteration as a practical approximation.

Block

Signs 
See also list of cuneiform signs.

The following table allows matching of Borger's 1981 and 2003 numbering with Unicode characters 
The "primary" transliteration column has the glyphs' Sumerian values as given by the official glyph name, slightly modified here for legibility by including traditional assyriological symbols such as "x" rather than "TIMES". The exact Unicode names can be unambiguously recovered by prefixing, 
"CUNEIFORM [NUMERIC] SIGN", replacing "TIMES" for "x", "PLUS" for "+" and "OVER" for "/", "ASTERISK" for "*", "H" for "Ḫ", "SH" for "Š", and switching to uppercase.

History
The following Unicode-related documents record the purpose and process of defining specific characters in the Cuneiform Numbers and Punctuation block:

See also
List of cuneiform signs

References
Rylke Borger, Assyrisch-Babylonische Zeichenliste, 2nd ed., Neukirchen-Vluyn (1981)
Rylke Borger, Mesopotamisches Zeichenlexikon, Münster (2003). *Michael Everson, Karljürgen Feuerherm, Steve Tinney, "Final proposal to encode the Cuneiform script in the SMP of the UCS", ISO/IEC JTC1/SC2/WG2 N2786 (2004).

External links
cuneiformsigns.org  by Lloyd Anderson
 Cuneiform Unicode.org chart (PDF)
 Cuneiform Numbers and Punctuation Unicode.org chart (PDF)

Font packages
Akkadian (reproduces the Sumerian (3rd millennium BC) glyphs given in the Unicode (reference chart), by George Douros.
 FreeIdgSerif (branched off FreeSerif), encodes some 390 Old Assyrian (2nd millennium BC) glyphs used in Hittite cuneiform.

Cuneiform
Cuneiform